Jānis Jansons (born 25 May 1990 in Limbaži) is set to compete for Latvia at the 2018 Winter Olympics.

References

External links
 

1990 births
Living people
Latvian male bobsledders
Bobsledders at the 2018 Winter Olympics
Olympic bobsledders of Latvia
People from Limbaži
21st-century Latvian people